Ian Pratt may refer to:

 Ian Pratt (computer scientist), chief architect of the open-source Xen project and chairman of Xen.org
 Ian Pratt (politician), member of the Western Australian Legislative Assembly